Gujarat State Handloom and Handicrafts Development Corporation Ltd is an agency of Government of Gujarat established in 1973 with the main objective of identification, revival, development of handicrafts and handlooms of Gujarat.The Corporation markets products of artisans through its Garvi-Gurjari chain of emporiums in India and supply to exporters.

See also
 Khadi
 Khādī Development and Village Industries Commission (Khadi Gramodyog)

References

State agencies of Gujarat
Gujarati culture
1973 establishments in Gujarat
State handicrafts development corporations of India
Handloom industry in India
Indian companies established in 1973
Government agencies established in 1973